Edward Stephens may refer to:

Edward Stephens (MP for Dover) (c. 1552–?), English politician
Edward Stephens (MP for Tewkesbury and Gloucestershire) (1597–c. 1670), English lawyer and politician
Edward Stephens (Royal Navy Lieutenant), see List of ships captured in the 19th century
Edward Bowring Stephens (1815–1882), English sculptor
Edward Stephen (1822-1895), also known as Stephens, Welsh minister and composer
Edward S. Stephens (1849–1909), American educator
Edward Stephens (Australian settler) (1811–1861), early Australian settler
Eddie Stevens, musician, member of Moloko & collaborator with Róisín Murphy

See also
Edward Stevens (disambiguation)